Ivica Čuljak (4 June 1960 – 27 January 1992), better known as Satan Panonski, was a Croatian punk musician, poet, artist and freak performer from Vinkovci.

Early life and career 
Čuljak was born on 4 June 1960 in Cerić, near Vinkovci. In 1977, he first appeared in the Vinkovci punk scene as Kečer II. In 1978, Čuljak moved to Germany, where he claimed to have had his "punk communion". By then, Čuljak already had problems with the law; he had spent three months in a correctional facility as punishment for avoiding mandatory military service. In 1980, Čuljak became a singer of an alternative punk band Pogreb X, enjoying minor success with the song Trpi, kurvo.

Čuljak would engage in gruesome acts of self-harm (or "autodestruction" in his own terms): cutting, smashing bottles on his head, and stabbing himself with safety pins. He justified his acts as a form of catharsis, to liberate the audience from "barricades put on by education and other brainwashing tortures". On 29 November 1981 (Yugoslavia's Republic Day), following a violent altercation on a Meri Cetinić concert, Čuljak stabbed a man who, according to Čuljak, had molested his brother, 15 times. The victim died instantly. Čuljak defended himself on the count of self-defence. He was sentenced to 12 years of prison in the notorious Goli Otok, and subsequently transferred to Popovača neuropsychiatric hospital. He would spend nine years in Popovača, where he was diagnosed with borderline personality disorder. The murder would leave a lasting effect on Čuljak. Milorad Milinković suggested that Čuljak self-harmed out of the remorse.

Following his release in 1989, Čuljak released two albums (Ljuljajmo ljubljeni ljubičasti ljulj, Nuklearne olimpijske igre) and a book (Mentalni ranjenik). He then adopted the alter ego Satan Panonski an alias based on the comment of a passer-by. Čuljak's bizarre performances continued. During his concert at KSET, he cut himself heavily while giving a tirade against "punkers with nationalities".

In 1991, Čuljak joined the Croatian army in the Croatian War of Independence. During an interview with Globus in November 1991, which took place during the war, he admitted to killing war prisoners. Čuljak subsequently revoked the statements and argued that he was "supporting Croatians in the process". His musical direction changed; Čuljak's last album Kako je panker branio Hrvatsku openly discusses killing Serbs, and promoted the use of violence, an attitude which Čuljak previously opposed. Some fans criticized the change of Čuljak's musical direction, attributing it to his alcohol or drug addiction.

Čuljak died in 1992 while still a Croatian soldier during the War of Independence. The cause of his death is unknown. It is rumored that he died after slipping and accidentally discharging the gun he was carrying. This was confirmed by Vlado Čuljak, Čuljak's brother.

Legacy 
Čuljak was the subject of a 33-minute documentary film, the graduate thesis of Serbian director Milorad Milinković. Named Satan Panonski and filmed in 1990, it is the only film about Čuljak made during his lifetime. It portrays his performance in Belgrade, at the Studentski kulturni centar and on air with Fleka on Radio B92.  Čuljak had an influence on Goran Bare, who called him a "Satan, but a deeply unhappy man". Zdenko Franjić, the owner of a record label Slušaj najglasnije on which most of Čuljak's work has been released, referred to Čuljak as a "renaissance artist".

Discography
 Ljuljajmo ljubljeni ljubičasti ljulj (1989)
 Nuklearne olimpijske igre (1990)
 Kako je panker branio Hrvatsku (1992)

See also
 GG Allin

References 

Croatian musicians
Croatian punk rock groups
People with borderline personality disorder
1960 births
1992 deaths
Accidental deaths in Croatia
Deaths by firearm in Croatia
Firearm accident victims
Croatian soldiers
Military personnel killed in the Croatian War of Independence